Glyphipterix cornigerella is a species of sedge moth in the genus Glyphipterix. It was described by Philipp Christoph Zeller in 1877. It is found in Colombia.

References

Moths described in 1877
Glyphipterigidae
Moths of South America